Dolomedes minor is a spider in the family Pisauridae that is endemic to New Zealand, where it is known as the nursery web spider.

Identification 
Dolomedes minor is pale brown with some being grayish, like the rocks around which they live, helping to camouflage them against predators. (Arnqvist, 1992)
The spider has large pedipalps, which are usually used for sensory purposes. The palps in the male Dolomedes minor are modified for putting sperm into the female's epigyne, which is located on the underside of the female's abdomen. The female Dolomedes minor can easily be identified based on this location of the epigyne. They possess large chelicerae, which are located just below the eyes. (Andrews, 1986) 
The spider has a body length of about 18 mm. The females are almost twice the size of the males. They move very fast and possess a long leg-span: over sixty millimeters for a fully grown female.

Natural global range 
The family Pisauridae, containing all nursery web spiders, has been estimated to contain over 300 species.

New Zealand range 
Dolomedes minor can be found throughout New Zealand in various vegetation types and altitude ranges.

Habitat preferences 

Dolomedes minor is found in a variety of habitats throughout New Zealand. They survive in a variety of terrains, from sea level up to subalpine areas, including shrubland containing Gorse (Ulex europaeus) and Manuka (Leptospermum scoparium), swamps and grasslands. When hunting, they can be seen waiting around the water's edge and active amongst the stones, although they are nocturnal hunters. The spider is noticeable in these areas due to the large white nests thickly webbed to the ends of plants throughout these regions. Females will usually remain with their young in these habitats once their nursery webs have been constructed.

Life cycle and phenology
Dolomedes minor are most commonly seen through the summer months from November to May. Over these months the females have been found with egg-sacs attached to them which are carried for at least 5 weeks in their fangs. After this the female will start to construct her nursery web, which is not made to catch prey but to ‘nurse’ young. This is made at night and built amongst and at the tips of foliage. It can be around six inches or more in length and will house the eggs and young. At night the females guard the web and during the day have been noted to move towards the base of the vegetation.
The spiderlings will emerge shortly after the webs construction, usually within a week or after they have changed skin, and after two weeks most young would have left the nest. It is presumed this is done by ‘ballooning’ a type of air dispersal to allow them to leave the nest. This air dispersal is done so on long floating strands of silk which can also aid leaving and moving to a variety of geographical boundaries.
There has been sightings of adult males with young adult females but no courtship or mating has been recorded. In other Dolomedes species, sexual cannibalism is high so it is possible that D. minor males will try mate with virgin females to avoid this. Hurried copulation (mating) has been found to be common in other Dolomedes species also.

Diet and predators
As a nocturnal species, Dolomedes minor hunts and scavenges for food at night. The prey spectrum of the spider consists of a variety of small organisms including locusts, other spiders, dobsonfly larvae, earthworms, bees and other small insects (Williams, 1978). Although Dolomedes is an effective hunter, previously deceased organisms will also be accepted as food. The spider does not use its web at any point during predation, but rather captures prey through methods of hunting. The spider tends to take a passive approach to hunting however, waiting for prey to make contact with it before attacking. Despite having four prominent posterior eyes, Dolomedes minor relies entirely on touch and chemical perception rather than sight in the detection of prey. These senses are facilitated by hair sensilla on the spiders body that allow them to detect and capture prey with no reliance on sight. A particular feeding behaviour exhibited by the Nurseryweb spider is the rapid consumption of prey when it is available. Individuals of the species have been observed capturing additional prey whilst still feeding on previously taken organisms, as well as commonly capturing and holding multiple insects at a time. This behaviour is thought to have a direct correlation with the nocturnal instinct of Dolomedes minor, with the need for rapid consumption stemming from the limited availability of prey at night. The number of active insects decreases rapidly after twilight and remains limited until a spike before dawn, this leaves the spiders with only small windows of time in which to capture sufficient prey to nourish themselves.

References

Further reading

 
 
 Encyclopaedia of New Zealand 1966 - 'SPIDER, NURSERY'
 Manaaki Whenua - Landcare Research - Dolomedes minor (Koch)
 Te Papa - Nursery Web Spiders
 Duperre, N. &. (2010). Pisauridae. Fauna of New Zealand (64).
 Harris, A. C. (1987). Pompilidae. Fauna of New Zealand, 12.
 McLintock, A. H. (1966). Spider, Nursery. An Encyclopedia of New Zealand
 S.Williams, D. (1979). The feeding behaviour of New Zealand Dolomedes species. New Zealand Journal of Zoology, 6 (1), 95-105.

minor
Spiders of New Zealand
Spiders described in 1876